Richard Hegarty (1884 – 3 October 1917) was an English professional footballer who played as a right back in the Football League for Stockport County.

Personal life 
Hegarty served as a sergeant in the Royal Field Artillery during the First World War and died of "wounds and gas" at Northumberland War Hospital on 3 October 1917. He was buried in Stranton Cemetery & Crematorium, Hartlepool. His elder brother Daniel died in service on 29 July 1919.

Career statistics

References

1884 births
1917 deaths
Footballers from Stockton-on-Tees
Footballers from County Durham
English footballers
Association football fullbacks
West Hartlepool F.C. players
Stockport County F.C. players
Sunderland Rovers F.C. players
Hartlepool United F.C. players
North Shields F.C. players
West Hartlepool St Joseph's F.C. players
English Football League players
Northern Football League players
British Army personnel of World War I
Royal Field Artillery soldiers
British military personnel killed in World War I